Filaret (Philaret) is a male given name of Greek origin, commonly used as a monastic name in the Orthodox Church. It may refer to:

People
 Patriarch Filaret (Feodor Romanov) (1553–1633), patriarch of Moscow from 1612 to 1633, father of Tsar Michael I of Russia
 Filaret, Metropolitan of Moscow (1782–1867), or Vasily Drozdov, patriarch of Moscow from 1821 to 1867
 Filaret Barbu (1903–1984), Romanian composer
 Filaret Kolessa (1871–1947), Ukrainian ethnographer, folklorist, composer, musicologist and literary critic
 Filaret Scriban (1811–1873), Romanian theologian
 Filaret (Denysenko), head of the Ukrainian Orthodox Church - Kiev Patriarchy since 1995
 Filaret, Metropolitan of Minsk and Slutsk from 1978 to 2013

Other uses
 Filaret Association, a Lithuanian political organization founded in 1820 by Tomasz Zan
 Filaret Station, the first railway station in Romania, now a bus station; see History of Bucharest
 Filaret, name of a hill and plain in Bucharest, where the Constitution of 15 June 1848 was acclaimed
 Filaret, a village in Giurgiţa Commune, Dolj County, Romania

See also
Philaretos (disambiguation)
Filarete, medieval Italian architect

Romanian masculine given names